Brachidius crassicornis is a species of beetles in the family Carabidae, the only species in the genus Brachidius.

References

Pterostichinae
Monotypic Carabidae genera